Deepak Mukut is an Indian film producer and distributor who works in Hindi cinema. He is the founder of Soham Rockstar Entertainment and Jhoom Jhoom Media, Deepak is known for producing films that include Dhaakad, Forensic, Thank God, Sanam Teri Kasam, and Mulk that brought him various awards.

Career 
Deepa Mukut is the son of the film producer Kamal Mukut. Deepak started his career in jewelry making and moved to Hong Kong.

He established Soham Rockstar Entertainment in 2016. He has made more than 15 serials and film-based programs on channels like Star TV, Sony, Colors, B4U, and Disney.

In 2016, he produced his first film Sanam Teri Kasam, starring Harshvardhan Rane and Mawra Hocane.

Filmography

Awards and nominations

References

External links 
 

Living people
Indian film directors
Film producers from Mumbai
Year of birth missing (living people)